Sun Sun is the 15th album by Casiopea, recorded and released in 1986.

Track listing

LP

CD

Personnel
Casiopea are
Issei Noro – electric guitar (Yamaha Issei Model, SG-3000 Fretless & Kramea Pitchrider-7000 with DX-7)
Minoru Mukaiya – keyboards (Yamaha DX-7, KX-88, KX-76, TX-816, QX-1, Korg DSS-1, EX-8000, Roland SBX-0, TR-727, Emulator-II, AKAI S-900 & acoustic piano)
Tetsuo Sakurai – electric bass (Yamaha Tetsuo Model, BB-5000, BB-3000 Fretless & Kramer KMZ-6000)
Akira Jimbo – drums (Yamaha YD-9000RG & RD, Zildjan cymbals, Simmons SDS-5)

Additional musicians
John Waite – lead vocal on "Something's Wrong (Change It)"
Frank Simms – lead Vocal on "Sun"
Background vocals on "Someone's Love" & "Conjunction" – Diva Gray, Vivian Cherry & Leatrice Griffin
Background vocals on "Sun" & "Something's Wrong (Change It)" – Casiopea
Borneo Horns – Horns
Stan Harrison – alto saxophone
Lenny Pickett – tenor saxophone
Steve Elson – tenor & baritone saxophone
Earl Gardner – trumpet
Lenny Pickett – horn arrangements
Pablo Rosario – Latin percussion
Guilmerue Franco, Marcio Sapel – Brazilian percussion on "Samba Mania"

Production
Producer – Carlos Alomar
Co-producer – Issei Noro
Engineer – Andy Heermans
Assistant engineer – Victor Deyglio, Lance Mcvickar, Tim Reppert
Sound adviser – Shun Miyazumi
A&R co-ordinator – Masato Arai, Toshikazu Awano
Mastering – Howie Weinberg
Management – Fumiaki Takahashi
Supervisor – Shinichi Toyama
Equipment co-ordinator: Katsuhiro Maruichi
Photo – Fumio Tomita
Design – Toshinao Tsukui
Remastering engineer – Kouji Suzuki (2016)

Release history

External links

References

1986 albums
Casiopea albums
Alfa Records albums